This is a timeline of incidents in 2005 that have been labelled as "terrorism" and are not believed to have been carried out by a government or its forces (see state terrorism and state-sponsored terrorism).

Guidelines 
 To be included, entries must be notable (have a stand-alone article) and described by a consensus of reliable sources as "terrorism".
 List entries must comply with the guidelines outlined in the manual of style under MOS:TERRORIST.
 Casualty figures in this list are the total casualties of the incident including immediate casualties and later casualties (such as people who succumbed to their wounds long after the attacks occurred).
 Casualties listed are the victims. Perpetrator casualties are listed separately (e.g. x (+y) indicate that x victims and y perpetrators were killed/injured).
 Casualty totals may be underestimated or unavailable due to a lack of information. A figure with a plus (+) sign indicates that at least that many people have died (e.g. 10+ indicates that at least 10 people have died) – the actual toll could be considerably higher. A figure with a plus (+) sign may also indicate that over that number of people are victims.
 If casualty figures are 20 or more, they will be shown in bold. In addition, figures for casualties more than 50 will also be underlined.
 Incidents are limited to one per location per day. If multiple attacks occur in the same place on the same day, they will be merged into a single incident.
 In addition to the guidelines above, the table also includes the following categories:

January 

Total incidents:

February 

Total incidents:

March 

Total incidents: 0

April 

Total incidents:

May 

Total incidents:

June  
Total Incidents: 0

July 

Total incidents:

August 

Total incidents:

September 

Total incidents:

October 

Total incidents:

November 

Total incidents:

December 

Total incidents:

See also
List of non-state terrorist incidents
List of Palestinian suicide attacks
List of Palestinian rocket attacks on Israel, 2001–2006

References

 
 2005
 2005
 
 
 2005
Terr